Westnewton  is a civil parish in the Borough of Allerdale in Cumbria, England.  It contains seven listed buildings that are recorded in the National Heritage List for England.  All the listed buildings are designated at Grade II, the lowest of the three grades, which is applied to "buildings of national importance and special interest".  The parish contains the village of Westnewton, and is otherwise rural.  The listed buildings consist of houses and associated structures, farmhouses and farm buildings, and two milestones.


Buildings

References

Citations

Sources

Lists of listed buildings in Cumbria